Williamson County Courthouse may refer to:

 Williamson County Courthouse (Illinois), in Marion, Illinois
 Williamson County Courthouse (Tennessee), Franklin, Tennessee
 Williamson County Courthouse (Texas), Georgetown, Texas
 Williamson County Courthouse Historic District